Charles Walter Hamilton Cochrane, MCS, CMG (3 August 1876 – 26 October 1932), was the 17th British Resident of Perak and Chief Secretary to Government of Malaya from 1929 to 1932.

Career
In 1899, Cochrane joined the Federated Malay Civil Service as a cadet.
He was an agent for the Malaya Information Agency, and became Under Secretary to the Government in 1921 and then in 1925 political Adviser in Johore. He became the 17th British Resident in Perak in 1929.  He was appointed as the Acting Chief Secretary to Government on 30 November 1930, when Sir William Peel was on leave.

Personal life
Cochrane was the fourth son of Rev. David Crawford Cochrane and Jane Elizabeth Tomlinson and was born at Barrow on Trent Vicarage. He was educated at Repton School where he was in the cricket XI and Merton College, Oxford where he graduated BA.
Cochrane married Cecile Laura Vetter (1885-1957), daughter of Carlos Vetter, on 26 July 1910 and had two children. Cochrane was the brother of Arthur Cochrane of the College of Arms, and Alfred Cochrane cricketer and writer.
He played cricket for the Straits Settlements cricket team in 1904 and 1905 and occasionally for the Federated Malay States cricket team from 1907 to 1913.
Cochrane retired in 1932 and lived at 21 Cheyne Court Chelsea. He died aged 56 later that year at St Peter's Hospital, Henrietta Street Covent Garden.

Awards and honours
Cochrane was invested with Companion of the Most Distinguished Order of St. Michael and St. George (CMG) in 1930.

Legacy
"Jalan Cochrane" in Kuala Lumpur was named after him and consequently Cochrane Road School, SMK Cochrane Perkasa and the  Cochrane MRT station take their names from him.

References

External links
Perak State Council

1876 births
1932 deaths
People educated at Repton School
Alumni of Merton College, Oxford
Straits Settlements cricketers
Federated Malay States cricketers
History of Perak
Administrators in British Malaya
Companions of the Order of St Michael and St George
British people in British Malaya